LNE may refer to:
 Laboratoire national de métrologie et d'essais, a French reference laboratory
 La Nouvelle École, international school in Rajasthan, India
 Lehigh and New England Railroad, a former American railroad
 La Nueva España, a newspaper published in Oviedo, Spain
 Lonorore Airport, IATA code LNE, on Pentecost Island, Vanuatu
 Limited nuclear exchange, a hypothesized, small-scale type of nuclear war